Ankershagen is a municipality  in the Mecklenburgische Seenplatte district, in Mecklenburg-Vorpommern, Germany. Components of the municipality Ankershagen are Ankershagen, Bocksee, Bornhof, Friedrichsfelde and Rumpshagen.

Main sights 
 Church Ankershagen
 Manor house Rumpshagen
 Manor house Friedrichsfelde (since 1999 the infopoint of Ankershagen with a chance to see Storks) near the Müritz National Park
 Heinrich Schliemann Museum

People 
 Johann Heinrich Voß (German poet and translator) in Ankershagen 1769 - 1792
 Heinrich Schliemann (German businessman and archaeologist, and an advocate of the historical reality of places mentioned in the works of Homer)

References

Municipalities in Mecklenburg-Western Pomerania
Grand Duchy of Mecklenburg-Schwerin